An election to the Neath Rural District Council in West Glamorgan, Wales was held on 7 May 1970. It was preceded by the 1967 election, and was the last election to the authority as the Rural District Council was abolished at the 1974 re-organization of local government in Wales

Overview of the results
The election was held shortly before the 197 General Election, which Labour was at the time tipped to win. A Plaid Cymru challenge did not materialize.

Candidates
At these final elections to the RDC, the profile of candidates was similar to three years previously with a number of long-serving Labour councillors again returned unopposed. While the Communist Party contested Seven Sisters, there was no candidate in their former stronghold of Onllwyn. At Rhigos, Independent councillor Henry Walters was returned unopposed as a Labour councillor.

Outcome
Independents gained two seats at the expense of Labour while losing another two, resulting in an unchanged representation overall.

Ward results

Baglan Higher (one seat)

Blaengwrach (two seats)

Blaenrhonddan, Bryncoch Ward (one seat)

Blaenrhonddan, Cadoxton Ward (one seat)

Blaenrhonddan, Cilfrew Ward (one seat)

Clyne (one seats)

Coedffranc, South Ward (one seat)

Coedffranc, East Central (one seat)

Coedffranc North Ward (one seat)

Coedffranc West Ward (one seat)

Coedffranc West Central (one seat)

Dyffryn Clydach (two seats)

Dulais Higher, Crynant Ward (one seat)

Dulais Higher, Onllwyn Ward (one seat)

Dulais Higher, Seven Sisters Ward (two seats)

Dulais Lower (one seat)

Michaelstone Higher (one seat)

Neath Higher (three seats)

Neath Lower (one seat)

Resolven, Resolven Ward (two seats)

Resolven, Rhigos Ward (two seats)

Resolven, Tonna Ward (two seats)

References

1967 Welsh local elections